Abraham de Balmes ben Meir (born at Lecce, in the kingdom of Naples; died at Venice, 1523)  was an Italian Jewish physician and translator of the early 16th century.

A short time before his death he was physician in ordinary to the cardinal Dominico Grimani at Padua. See Steinschneider, "Hebr. Bibl." xxi. 7 and 67; "Hebr. Uebers." p. 62; Perles, "Beiträge," pp. 193, 197, etc.

Through his Latin translations of many Hebrew works on philosophy and astronomy he attained a great reputation in the Christian world. He dedicated to Cardinal Grimani two of these translations: (1) of an astronomical work in Arabic by Ibn al-Heitham (died 1038), which had been translated into Hebrew by Jacob ben Machir, in 1372, under the title "Liber de Mundo"; (2) of the "Farewell Letter" of the Arabic philosopher Ibn Bajjah (Avempace), which he translated from the Hebrew under the title "Epistolæ Expeditionis" (MS. Vat. No. 3897. The dedication is published in "Revue des Études Juives," v. 145). In Padua Abraham delivered philosophical addresses to Christian audiences.

He also compiled a  book on Hebrew grammar, in which he attempted to treat philosophically the construction of the Hebrew language and to refute the opinions of the eminent grammarian David Kimhi. In this work Abraham was the first to treat the syntax (which he called in Hebrew harkabah) as a special part of the grammar. The book was published, with a Latin translation and a supplementary treatise on the Hebrew accents, under the title "Miḳneh Abram," by Maestro (Calo) Ḳalonymos ben David, a well-known translator. Grätz ("Gesch. der Juden," ix. 215) suggests, without evidence, that the printer Daniel Bomberg (who is supposed to have learned Hebrew from Balmes) translated this grammar.

At his death, honors were paid to his memory by his Christian pupils.

References
Steinschneider, Cat. Bodl. col. 667; 
idem, Hebr. Uebers. §§ 206, 348, 581; 
idem, Bibliographisches Handbuch, No. 164, Leipsic, 1859; 
T. Willesz's dissertation, Budapest, 1895

Further Bibliography

Saverio Campanini, in «Annali di Ca’ Foscari» XXXVI, 3, Serie orientale 28 (1997), pp. 5–49.

References
Source (jewishencyclopedia.com)

16th-century Italian physicians
16th-century Jewish physicians
16th-century Italian Jews
Hebrew–Latin translators
Medieval Hebraists
Grammarians of Hebrew
Grammarians from Italy
Year of birth unknown
1523 deaths
People from Lecce